Kuresoi North is a constituency in Kenya. Part of the former constituency of Kuresoi Community, it is one of eleven constituencies in Nakuru County formed in 2010 after Kuresoi Constituency was split into two.

Members of Parliament

References 

Constituencies in Nakuru County